Austrobaileya is a peer-reviewed annual scientific journal published by the Queensland Herbarium. It covers systematic botany, relating to the flora of Queensland and in particular tropical Australia. It was established in 1968 as Contributions from the Queensland Herbarium, obtaining its current title in 1977, with volume numbering restarted at 1. Since 2015, the journal is published open access, with print versions available on subscription. Older issues are available online from JSTOR.

The journal was named after the Queensland endemic genus Austrobaileya.

Abstracting and indexing
The journal is abstracted and indexed in Biological Abstracts, BIOSIS Previews, CAB Abstracts, and Scopus.

References

External links

Botany journals of Australia
Publications established in 1968
Botany journals
Botany in Queensland
English-language journals
Annual journals
1968 establishments in Australia